The 2009 Americas Combined Events Cup were held in La Habana, Cuba, at the Estadio Panamericano on May 29–30, 2009. 
A detailed report on the event and an appraisal of the results was given.

Complete results were published.

Medallists

Results

Men's Decathlon
Key

Women's Heptathlon
Key

Participation
An unofficial count yields the participation of 32 athletes from 7 countries. Cuba entered with two teams (A and B).  The announced athlete from  did not show.

 (2)
 (5)
 (6 A / 5 B)
 (3)
 (5)
 (5)
 (1)

See also
 2009 in athletics (track and field)

References

Pan American Combined Events Cup
Americas Combined Events Cup
International athletics competitions hosted by Cuba
Americas Combined Events Cup